Nayagi is a 2018 Indian Tamil-language Family Drama series. It premiered on 19 February 2018 on Sun TV, replacing Deivamagal, and was replaced by Anbe Vaa and it ended on 31 October 2020. The show was produced by Vikatan Televistas Pvt Ltd and directed by S Kumaran. Nayagi was also re-aired on Kalaignar TV from 1 March 2021 and it ended its run on 9 July 2022.

Naayagis first season revolves around three women and their families: Anandhi, a sweet-natured, easy-going woman; Kanmani, a playful but bold woman; and Sargunam, a formidable lady who has risen despite difficulties. The first season of the show initially starred Vijayalakshmi but later she was replaced by Vidya Pradeep with Dhilip Rayan and Ambika.

The second season story mainly revolves around Prakash who is heart kind and amusing man. Meanwhile Divya, a strong and resilient woman who is the breadwinner of her family and Koothapiran family mainly Sargunam and Kanmani. The second season of this show has Krishna reprising his role as Prakash (as previously played in Deivamagal) along with Arvind Khatare, Suhasini, Apollo Ravi reprising their comic roles and Ashok Kumar reprising as Krishna's friend Ashok as previously portrayed in Deivamagal

Plot

Season 1 (2018–2020)
Anandhi is a middle-class woman who is the secret heir of a rich couple. She lives with her adoptive father, Kathiresan and brother Muthukumar. She marries Thirumurugan "Thiru", son of the Kalivaradan, who killed Anandhi's real father and took his property. Kalivardan had kept his wife alive, and hidden, as there was property in her name and he needed to write it out to himself. Nobody knows about Anandhi's true identity. Thiru's childhood friend, Ananya is Anandhi's half-sister, whose mother is the half-sister of Anandhi's real mother Leelavathi. Ananya wants to marry Thiru to obtain the property.

Vasanthi's sister, Sargunam is a woman who given usury to her people. She has three children, Chezhiyan, Gopinath and Meghala. Chezhiyan marries Anandhi's best friend, Kanmani, opposing his mother. Sargunam helps Anandhi to live happily as Kalivaradan helps Ananya to get property. Meanwhile, Thiru, Anandhi and Vasanthi save Leelavathi from Kalivaradan. Anandhi takes care of Leelavathi in her home without knowing their real relation.

Later, it is revealed that Anandhi is the Leelavathi's daughter and the heir of property. Seeing the true colors of Kalivaradan, Thiru breaks all ties with him. Meanwhile, Ananya fakes her death leading Anandhi to arrested. Soon, Ananya's true colors revealed and is sent to jail for 5 years.

5 years later

Anandhi and Thiru live with their daughter, Yazhini. Ananya is still in jail and has a son, Akilan who born to Ananya and Thiru illegally through IVF without Thiru's Knowledge. Yazhini and Akilan become best friends without knowing the truth. Ananya returns and uses Akilan as a weapon to join Thiru. Anandhi doubts about Akilan because his behavior is like Thiru. Soon, Thiru finds out that Akilan is his and Ananya's son and gets his custody with Anandhi's help.

Thiru's sister, Anupriya "Anu" returns to India. Her marriage is fixed to her fiancé, Mithran. Meanwhile, Thiru and Anandhi plan to Ananya's marriage with Thiru's friend, Karthik. Anu marries Mithran while Ananya manages to cancel her marriage with Karthik. Later, Ananya brainwashes Mithran and teaches him to take Anandhi's property. As a result of this, Mithran keeps Kathiresan as his servant to Anandhi's dismay. Later, Ananya destroys Anandhi's business by some fake agreements. But she is exposed and imprisoned along with Kalivardhan and Duraiyarasan. Anandhi receives another deal which allowed her to export their products out of India for the first time. Her business becomes successful, and tours to Singapore with their kids for their business.

Season 2 (2020)
Ezhilan travels to Chennai from his home town Thenkasi to get a banking job, but Divya, the sole wage earner of her family, gets that job. Meanwhile, in the Koothapiran–Sargunam family, Kanmani and Chezhiyan are made to leave the house by Gopi's evil plans and he also plans to control Sargunam and her wealth. Meghala and her husband Maran try to convince Sargunam but Gopi makes Sargunam to exclude them too. After chasing his two siblings, Gopi plans to take Kanmani's councillor posting but it fails. Later, Kanmani becomes pregnant and her problem are solved. Next, Coming to Ezhilan's track, He loses everything with Divya and later Divya's brother-in-law Aatralarasan. However, Pity Ezhilan came to Divya's home with Aatralasan. After his visit, the house became happy. Then, Divya falls in love with Ezhilan. She sacrificed her job opportunity for ezhil.

There, Rajalakshmi, owner of that company is the original mother of Ezhilan and she lost him when he was younger and ended up in the hands of his adoptive mother Sakunthala. Now, Aakash, Rajalakshmi's second son loves Divya and she had proposal his son with Divya. Ezhilan also gives up his love on Divya because she would get a rich life. But Ezhilan learns that Aakash is a psycho and he is not at all good for Divya's life. Then, he plans to stop the marriage but Aakash kidnaps Ezhilan and blackmiles Divya to marry him. Ezhilan later escapes and Aakash kidnaps Divya's younger sister Savitha to blackmail her. Eventually even Savitha is rescued. Meanwhile, in Sargunam-Koothapiran family, Gopi tries to poison Sargunam but Kanmani drinks it and is sent to the hospital. Sargunam learns that Gopi is evil and that he tried to kill her and sends him to jail. She accepts Kanmani and Chezhiyan and brings them back into her house, and they are happy. Ezhilan and his friend Ashok come in the form of two priests and enter Rajalakshmi's house where the wedding is happening. When Divya is about to marry Akash, Ezhilan reveals his disguise and suddenly marries Divya while Aakash is pulled to side with a knife on his neck by Ashok. Rajalakshmi, furious that her son's marriage was ruined, grabs a gun and is about to shoot Ezhilan, and then her elder brother reveals that Ezhilan is actually her son and that he stole Ezhilan and gave him to one of their employees to raise as revenge for her humiliating him years ago. Rajalakshmi forgives Ezhilan and begins to love him. Akash also improves and lets Divya and Ezhilan live a happy married life and accepts Ezhilan as his brother.

Cast

Main cast 
 Vijayalakshmi / Vidhya Pradeep as Anandhi Kathiresan Thirumurugan – Leelavathi's daughter; Kathiresan's adoptive daughter; Muthu's adoptive sister; Ananya's half-cousin; Kanmani's best friend; Thiru's wife; Yazhini's mother; Akilan's adoptive mother. (2018) / (2018–2020) 
 Ambika as Sargunam Koothapiran – A businesswoman; Vasanthi's sister; Chezhiyan, Gopi and Megala's mother; Varsha's grandmother. (2018–2020)
 Nakshathra Nagesh as Divyalakshmi "Divya" Prakash – Geeta and Savitha's sister; Prakash's wife; Aakash's ex-fiancée. (2020)
 Dhilip Rayan as Thirumurugan "Thiru" Kalivardhan – Vasanthi and Kalivardhan's son; Anu's brother; Ananya's childhood friend and ex-fiancé; Anandhi husband; Yazhini and Akilan's father. (2018–2020)
 Krishna as Gnanaprakash "Prakash" aka Ezhilan – Rajalakshmi's son; Aakash's brother; Divya's husband. (2020)

Recurring 
 Papri Ghosh as Kanmani Sigamani Chezhiyan – Sigamani and Sarala's elder daughter; Malarvizhi's sister; Anandi's best friend; Chezhiyan's wife. (2018–2020) 
 Archana Lakshminarasimhaswamy / Koli Ramya / Sushma Nair as Ananya Duraiyarasan – Duraiyarasan and Kalyani's daughter; Anandhi's half-cousin; Thiru's childhood friend and ex-fiancée; Akhilan's mother. (2018) / (2018–2019) / (2019–2020)
 Vetrivel as Chezhiyan Koothapiran: Sargunam and Koothapiran's elder son; Gopinath and Meghala's brother; Kanmani's husband. (2018–2020)
 Vijith as Aakash: Rajalakshmi's son; Prakash's brother; Divya ex-fiancé. (2020)
 Meera Krishna as Vasanthi Kalivaradhan: Sargunam's sister; Kalivaradhan's wife; Thiru and Anu's mother; Yazhini and Akilan's grandmother. (2018–2020)
 Suresh Krishnamurthi as Kalivaradhan: Duraiyarasan's best friend; Vasanthi's husband; Thiru and Anu's father; Yazhini and Akilan's grandfather. (2018–2020)
 Devi Teju as Leelavathi: Kalyani's half-sister; Anandhi's mother; Yazhini's grandmother; Akilan's adoptive grandmother. (2018–2020)
 Udumalai Ravi as Kathiresan: Anandhi's adoptive father; Muthu's father; Yazhini and Akilan's adoptive grandfather. (2018–2020)
 Ajay Kumar as Muthukumar "Muthu" Kathiresan: Kathiresan's son; Anandhi's adoptive brother. (2018–2019)
 Mirudhula Shree as Yazhini Thirumurugan: Anandhi and Thiru's daughter; Akilan's half-sister. (2019–2020)
 Jashik Ja as Akilan Thirumurugan: Ananya and Thiru's son; Anandhi's adoptive son; Yazhini's half-brother. (2019–2020)
 Pradeepa Muthu / Shimona James as Anupriya "Anu" Kalivaradhan Mithran: Vasanthi and Kalivaradhan's daughter; Thiru's sister; Mithran's wife (2018–2019) / (2019–2020) 
 Raghul Kanagaraj as Mithran Kumar: Anu's husband (2019–2020)
 Aarthi Ramkumar as Rajalakshmi: Prakash and Akash's mother (2020)
 Yogesh Venugopal as Gopinath "Gopi" Koothapiran: Sargunam and Koothapiran's younger son; Chezhiyan and Meghala's brother; Sumathi's husband; Varsha's father (2018–2020)
 Anusai Elakeya as Sumathi Gopinath: Gopinath's wife; Varsha's mother. (2018–2020)
 Baby Aazhiya as Varsha Gopinath: Sumathi and Gopinath's daughter (2019–2020)
 Dhakshana as Meghala Koothapiran Maaran: Sargunam and Koothapiran's daughter; Chezhiyan and Gopinath's sister; Maaran's wife (2018–2020)
 Ranjith Babu as Maaran Sethuraman: Sethuraman's son; Meghala's husband (2018–2020)
 Senthilnathan as Koothapiran: Sargunam's husband; Chezhiyan, Gopi and Meghala's father; Varsha's grandfather (2018–2020)
 Kavi Rajini as Sethuraman: Sargunam's rival; Maaran's father (2019-2020)
 Padine Kumar as Shalini Ashok: Divya's friend; Ashok's wife (2020)
 Ashok Kumar as Ashok: Prakash's friend; Shalini's husband (2020)
 Suhasini / Akalya Venkatesan as Geetha Aatral: Divya and Savitha's elder sister; Aatral's wife (2020)
 Arvind Kathare as Aatral Arasan: Geetha's husband (2020)
 Vaishnavi Sundar as Savitha: Geetha and Divya's younger sister (2020)
 Ganesh as Sigamani: Kanmani and Malarvizhi's father (2018–2020)
 Praveena → Suchitra as Sarala Sigamani: Kanmani and Malarvizhi's mother (2018–2020)
 Vishnupriya → Srinisha Jayswal as Malarvizhi Sigamani: Sigamani and Sarala's daughter; Kanmani's sister (2018–2020)
 Sowmiya Ravindran as Suhasini: Cheziyan's ex-fiancée (2018–2020)
 Krishna Kumar as Venkat: Rajalakshmi's brother; Shreya's father (2020)
 Shruti Shivanagowda as Shreya: Venkat's daughter; Prakash and Akash's cousin (2020)
 Giridhar Thirumalachary as Perumal: Kalivardhan's personal assistant (2018–2020)
 Ashok Pandian as Minister Duraiyarasan: Kalivaradhan's best friend; Kalyani's husband; Ananya's father; Akilan's grandfather (2018–2020)
 Meerabhi / Mercy Leyal as Kalyani Duraiyarasan: Leelavati's half-sister; Duraiyarasan's wife; Ananya's mother; Akilan's grandmother (2018–2020)
 Mukesh Kanna as Vishwa: Rajalakshmi's niece (2020)
 Sasikala Shree as Aatral's mother (2020)
 Ravi as Nesamani, Aatral's sidekick (2020)
 Yuvasree as Sakunthala: Prakash's adopted mother; Amuda and Karna's mother (2020)
 Lavanya Manickam as Amuda: Sakunthala's daughter; Prakash's adopted sister; Karna's sister (2020)
 Tarun Appasamy as Karna: Sakunthala's son; Prakash's adopted brother; Amuda's brother (2020)
 Sanjay Shah as Guruji (2018–2020)
 Lingesh Shank as Karthik: Thiru's friend who loves Ananya (2020)
 Raja Senthil as Karthik's father (2020)
 Uma Rani as Karthik's mother (2020)
 Devankumar as Ranjith: Anandhi's rival (2018–2019)

Production

Development
Due to COVID-19 outbreak in India, the production was halted in mid March 2020, Nayagi was put on hiatus on Wednesday 3 April 2020 when the remaining episodes aired. Post COVID-19 break, the production resumed in July 2020 and new episodes started to telecast from 27 June 2020. During which, the story had a change in leads and story with a new season along with many new additions starring Krishna and Nakshathra Nagesh while former lead characters Thiru, Anandhi and their family's track being ended abruptly, while Sargunam and Kanmani's family track continued. The second season of the series began on 27 July 2020 and the series was off aired on 31 October 2020 due to drastic decline of ratings post COVID-19 break.

Casting
Actress Vidya Pradeep was selected to portray the role of Anandhi after the exit of Vijayalakshmi. Sun TV Anchor Dhilip Rayan was cast in the lead male role of Thirumurugan. They made their debuts with the series. Actress Ambika was selected to portray the role of Sarkunam, making a comeback after previously acting in the serial Sare Gama Gama Gama (2013–2014). Malayalam Actress Meera Krishnan was selected to play Vasanthi, after having appeared in director Thiruselvam Tamil serial Pokkisham (2012–2013)

Release

On 10 February 2018, the first promo of Ambika's 'Naayagi Teaser: Sarkunam' was released by Vikatan TV on YouTube. On 10 February, the second lead female. On 13 and 14 February, the third (Kalivardhan) and fourth (Meera Krishnan) promos of the show were released by Vikatan TV YouTube channel and Sun TV.

Reception
Until before COVID-19 break in March 2020, the series used to be one of the top five Tamil television programs consistently. In week 52 of 2018, it was at second position with 10.515 million impressions. In first two weeks of January 2019, it garnered 10.606 and 10.467 million impressions maintaining its second position. In week 49 of 2019, it maintains its second position with 10.099 million impressions. However when the series resumed its airing post Covid-19 break with the change in its story, main lead and time slot from 8:00 pm (IST) to 9:00 pm (IST), in July 2020, the ratings of the series had a drastic drop and it was off aired in October 2020.

Adaptations

References

External links
 Official website 
 

2010s Tamil-language television series
2018 Tamil-language television series debuts
2020 Tamil-language television series endings
2018 Indian television series debuts
2020 Indian television series endings
Sun TV original programming
Tamil-language television shows